Rich Christensen is an American television producer from New Hampton, IA. Christensen went to school at the University of Northern Iowa. He is best known as the creator, lead executive producer and host of the racing shows Pinks and Pinks: All Out, the number two and three shows on the Speed Channel.

TV series career 

"Pinks All Outtakes" (2008)
Coming from the success of "Pinks All Out" This new series goes behind the scenes of the tournament race events and helps to enlighten us on what a "phenomenon" the "Pinks" series has become, with over 40,000 people attending the "All Out" race events, this new show gives insight to the drag racing culture and the people that attend these events which are put on by "Pinks", and the Speed Channel

"Pass Time" (2007)
Originally called "Name that Test-and-Tune" (a reference to a term used in drag strips for test sessions) when it was a pilot, a game show where three contestants predict the times of ten cars from an actual drag strip test session down the quarter-mile.

"Rapid Turnover" (2007)
Dirtbike and ATV riders compete in an unusual race.

"Speed Records" (2007)
Hosted by Kevin Deane, a qualified driver, where he tests out top speed on exotic cars.

"Blow It Up" (2007)
Top engine builders compete to see whose motor will hold or blow up in a hot lap drag race.

"Pinks: All Out" (2007)
Hundreds of the best drag racers in the country bring their game to the track in search of glory and their share of $18,000 in cold, hard cash in PINKS All Out.

"Drag Race High" (2007)
A documentary series on Speed featuring two classes of high school automobile repair classes from rival Tennessee high schools building drag racing cars to compete in a drag race.

"Pinks" (2005)
Lose the race, Lose your ride! Using the setting of a classic 1950s drag race, PINKS pits contestants in a best two-out-of-three format, with the loser handing over the title (pink slip) to his or her vehicle. The rules are simple: two vehicles show up and drivers negotiate any head-start distance (vehicle lengths); vehicles line up, the flagman drops the flag and the first one down the quarter mile wins. After each round, the drivers have the opportunity to re-negotiate lengths.

"Won and Done" (2013-)
MAVTV game show format based on drag racing.

References

External links
 Rich Christensen Entertainment
 

Living people
People from New Hampton, Iowa
American television producers
University of Northern Iowa alumni
Year of birth missing (living people)